Pingasa porphyrochrostes is a moth of the family Geometridae first described by Louis Beethoven Prout in 1922. It is found on Seram in Indonesia.

References

Pseudoterpnini
Moths described in 1922
Taxa named by Louis Beethoven Prout